NeDi is an open source software tool which discovers, maps and inventories network devices and tracks connected end-nodes. It contains a number of features in a GUI for managing enterprise networks. For example: MAC address mapping/tracking, traffic & error graphing, uptime monitoring, correlate collected syslog & trap messages with customizable notification, drawing network maps, extensive reporting features such as device software, PoE usage, disabled interfaces, link errors, switch usage and many more. Its modular architecture allows for integration with other tools. For example, Cacti graphs can be created purely based on discovered information. Due to NeDi's versatility things like printer resources can be monitored as well.

Features 
 Network Discovery, management & monitoring
 Netflow & sFlow based traffic analysis
 IT Inventory & lifecycle management
 Network topology visualisation
 Locate & Track Computers
 Security audits & more
 VM, DC management
 Printer management
 Backup Configs
 IT Reports

History 
Development started in 2001 at the Paul Scherrer Institute by Remo Rickli. It was released to the public under GPL2 in 2003. Over the next decade, NeDi grew up to be a reasonable network management suite with the help of its community and partners.

In 2014 Remo Rickli founded NeDi Consulting, providing commercial support and development around NeDi. Since then a major update is released every year (e.g. 1.5 in 2015).

Accessibility 
Access to the latest version can be bought with support, on a yearly subscription basis. The last year's version is released to the public under GPL3. Some premium modules are not included in this free "community edition".

See also
 RRDtool, Used for graphs
 D3.js, Used for dynamic maps (interactive force directed graphs)
 Leaflet (software), Used for geographic maps
 Comparison of network monitoring systems

References

External links
 Official website
 Community forum
 Youtube tutorials

Free network management software
Internet Protocol based network software
Network analyzers